Sanon Wangsrangboon is a Thai social entrepreneur and politician, currently serving as a Deputy Governor of Bangkok.

Early life and education 
Wangsrangboon completed secondary education from Saint Gabriel's College and graduated from Chulalongkorn University with a bachelor of engineering degree, and has co-founded several social enterprises. He previously campaigned against evictions in the Mahakan Fort community.

Career 
Wangsrangboon is charged with social development and education, including creating the Open Bangkok Data Project to identify accident sites and air quality across the city.

References 

 
Living people
1989 births
Sanon Wangsrangboon
Sanon Wangsrangboon
Sanon Wangsrangboon